Bình Mỹ is a rural commune of Củ Chi District in Ho Chi Minh City, Vietnam.

References

Communes of Vietnam
Populated places in Ho Chi Minh City